The National Reserve Corps (Dutch: Korps Nationale Reserve, abbreviated Natres) is a part of the  Royal Netherlands Army. NATRES is a corps in the sense that it has a specialized task. The reservist is, like all Dutch military personnel, a military volunteer.

History
Since the 13th century, the Dutch government has relied on voluntary armed citizens to defend their homes and to maintain public order. At first this task was carried out by so-called 'shooter guilds'. In the 16th century the voluntary armed citizens, under the influence of William I, Prince of Orange, were organised into militias. These militias were dissolved in 1908.

The outbreak of the First World War and the growing foreign threat lead to the formation of a new unit called the 'Voluntary Landstorm' on the 4 August 1914. At the end of World War I this unit consisted of 6,000 men. In the turbulent times of the Interbellum the Dutch Prime Minister Hendrikus Colijn made the decision to extend the service of this force. At the beginning of World War II this unit consisted of around 98,000 men.

In the years after World War II again the need was felt for a rapidly deployable unit for the defense and security of Dutch territory. While the majority of the Dutch forces then were deployed in Indonesia, the threat of the Soviet Union increased. Therefore, the National Reserve was established on the 14 April 1948. During the Cold War the National Reserve developed into a versatile part of the Royal Dutch Army and received the status of Corps. In the 80s the first women entered the National Reserve Corps. After the Cold War, the Royal Dutch Army changed dramatically in character. Conscription for military service was suspended. The Dutch Army shrank and became more frequently involved in peacekeeping or peace-enforcing missions abroad which resulted in a renewed relevance of the corps.

Task & roles

 General defence of national territory.
 Surveillance and security at strategic objects as bridges, power stations, etc.
 Disaster relief during floods, fire, etc.
 Ceremonial duties, guards of honour.
 Military assistance to civil authorities to maintain public order.
 Assistance of operational units during exercise and missions

Notable actions
 Two NATRES battalions gave assistance during the flooding of the province of Limburg in 1995.

Organisation
The corps' battalions are based on regions, commanded by operational brigades.

10 Natresbataljon
Under command of the 43 Gemechaniseerde Brigade.
Serving in the provinces of Groningen, Friesland, Drenthe, Gelderland and Overijssel

20 Natresbataljon
Under command of the 11 Luchtmobiele Brigade.
Serving in the provinces of North Holland, South Holland, Utrecht and Flevoland

30 Natresbataljon
Under command of the 13 Motorized Brigade.
Serving in the provinces of Zeeland, North Brabant and Limburg

Other
Fanfare Korps Nationale Reserve
The corps' regimental headquarters and a special reservist department at the Royal Netherlands Army headquarters.
Attached to the Corps, but not part of it is No.1 CIMIC battalion; for Civil-Military Co-operation and CA.
The corps has its own museum in Harskamp, the Netherlands.

Personnel
NATRES units and personnel are not deployed abroad as their charter does not allow this. Individual soldiers (mostly NCO's and officers) are deployed as individual replacements or specialists, but always voluntarily. When a reservist is deployed, they do so under the capbadge of the regular unit they are attached to.

See also
 Home Guard

References

External links
Korps Nationale Reserve official website
 
 
 

National Reserve
Military administrative corps
Militias in Europe
Military units and formations established in 1948